Bjøro Håland (born 6 October 1943) is a Norwegian country singer.

He was born on Håland in Audnedal, Norway, and grew up with five siblings. In 1960, he emigrated to the USA. He worked as a construction worker and sang in bars. He moved back to Norway in 1966.

Håland has released 22 records which have sold four million copies.

Discography 
Diamonds Are Forever (2007)
Mine Salmer (2004)
Blue Sky (2000)
All The Best (1995)
The Door To My Heart (1995)
Nashville-Here We Go Again (1990)
Rett Fra Hjertet (1989)
By Request (1989)
Bjøro Håland 87 (1987)
Bjøro's best (1986)
Just For You (1984)
Min Stetson Og Gitar (1984)
On Tour (1983)
Mitt Julealbum (1983)
Bjøro Håland (1982)
My Nashville Album (1981)
To My Friends (1980)

References

1943 births
Living people
Norwegian country singers
People from Vest-Agder
Norwegian expatriates in the United States
Grappa Music artists